The Jewish Community of Nizhny Novgorod contains about 15,000 people. The synagogue within the community is at 5a Gruzinskaya Street.

The community includes the comprehensive Jewish school, Or Avner; the kindergarten, Gan Menachem; the yeshiva, Tomhey Tmimim; and the summer camp for boys and girls, Gan Isroel.

History

Jews have lived on the territory of Nizhny Novgorod since the 19th century. The laws of the Russian Empire prohibited Jews from living in the center of Russia, allowing them land only in the Pale of Settlement. Only merchants of the top guild and retired soldiers of the imperial army could live there. Nevertheless, the high trade and industrial development of Nizhny Novgorod attracted people, and Jews started arrive at Nizhny Novgorod from western regions of the empire. The majority of migrants were dealers and merchants. They arrived at Nizhny Novgorod to different trade fairs on the territory of the famous local fair. But there was no permanent Jewish community in the city until 1840, prompted by the decree of the tsar that started to recruit Jews for military service.

The community of Nizhny Novgorod was said to have been founded by the tsar's soldiers, because soldiers were required to live in the city where they served. They subsequently became merchants and traders.

The Nizhny Novgorod synagogue

In 1850, the Nizhny Novgorod community numbered 300 people, and there were 3000 people in 1913. The synagogue was built in the period from 1881 to 1883. The synagogue was led by a rabbi and a chief rabbi. There they formed a yeshiva and held charitable and funeral services.

Despite the increase of Jewish refugees in Nizhny Novgorod, government policy was aimed at reducing the Jewish population in the Nizhny Novgorod region. By 1938 all the synagogue, club and national society was abolished.

The synagogue was re-established in 1991 after the fall of the Soviet regime.

Current status

The revival of the Jewish community began in 1989, when several influential Jewish cities organized the Jewish Culture Club. Later, Lipa Gruzman registered religious communities officially and began taking action to return the synagogue buildings. September 1991 brought the opening of the Sunday Jewish School, and on April 17 the synagogue held an official opening ceremony after its renovation.

In 1989 Edward M. Chaprak was appointed as head of the community.

In 1999 Shimon Bergman came to Nizhny Novgorod to serve as the Chief Rabbi of the city. Under his leadership, the daily minyan was updated in the synagogue, and various Jewish institutions were opened in the city: the school Or Avner-Habad; the kindergarten, Gan Menachem; a youth club; and a summer camp with a boarding yeshiva, Torah lessons, and various activities for holidays. Two years later, the mikvah for women was built.

References

External links

 The Jewish community of Nizhny Novgorod 

Nizhny Novgorod
Jewish Russian and Soviet history
Jewish communities in Russia